Donald Allen Samuel (February 16, 1924 – November 23, 2010) was an American football player who played at the defensive back and halfback positions.

A native of Hood River, Oregon, he played college football for the Oregon State Beavers. He was selected by the Los Angeles Rams in the third round (25th overall pick) of the 1946 NFL Draft. He played for the Steelers during the 1949 and 1950 seasons and appeared in a total of six NFL games.

References

1924 births
2010 deaths
Pittsburgh Steelers players
Oregon State Beavers football players
Players of American football from Oregon